Sport and Speed is a 1952 documentary directed by Ray Densham and starring Eamonn Andrews.

References

External links
Sport and Speed at BFI

1952 documentary films
1952 films
1950s English-language films
British sports documentary films
1950s British films